St Piran's is a prep school located on Gringer Hill in Maidenhead, Berkshire, England. The school was known as Cordwalles School until 1919 and has been co-educational since the 1990s.

History

The origin of St Piran's was in 1805 at a small school, the Revd John Potticary's school in Blackheath, at 2–3 Eliot Place. After moving to its present location in 1872, it operated as a boys' boarding school under the name of Cordwalles School until 1919. Up to this time, it was among a group of preparatory schools – which included Stubbington House School and Eastman's Royal Naval Academy – that maintained strong connections with the Royal Navy. In that year, 1919, the school was bought by Major Vernon Seymour Bryant who renamed it St Piran's. It reopened in 1920 with 23 boys, increasing to 65 the following year.

After becoming an educational trust in 1972, the school became co-educational in 1993, and boarding ended the same year. In 2005, St. Piran's celebrated its 200th anniversary with a bicentennial pageant. In 2008 a new geography room and lower school hall were completed.

Headmasters
, the headmasters of the school have been:

 John Potticary 1805–1820
 George Brown Francis Potticary 1820–1850
 Richard Cowley Powles 1850–1865
 Thomas Jackson Nunns 1865–1890
 Charles William Hunt 1890–1902
 Cyril Robert Carter 1902–1910
 Theodore William Keeling 1910–1912
 Mervyn Frank Voules 1912–1919
 Vernon Seymour Bryant 1919–1926
 Arthur Grendon Tippet DSO 1926–1943
 Lowther Grendon Tippet 1943–1972
 Guy Gross and Andrew Perry 1972–1980
 Andrew Perry 1980–1982
 Andrew Blumer 1982–2001
 Jonathan Carroll 2001–2019
 Seb Sales 2019–present

Former pupils
 Admiral Sir Claud Barry, KBE CB DSO
 Benjamin Disraeli
 Cecil Malone
 Victor Mollo
 Vice Admiral Sir Peveril William-Powlett, KCB KCMG CBE DSO
 Thomas Field Gibson and his cousin Charles Ronalds
 Anthony West (author)
 Patrick Leigh Fermor (expelled)

References

External links
 School website
 Profile on the ISC website
 Memories of a 1960's pupil

Private schools in the Royal Borough of Windsor and Maidenhead
Educational institutions established in 1805
Preparatory schools in Berkshire
Maidenhead
1805 establishments in England
Preparatory schools associated with the Royal Navy